Rocco Zoppo, real name Giovan Maria di Bartolomeo Bacci di Belforte (floruit 1496-1508) was a Florentin painter, a pupil and collaborator of Pietro Perugino.

According to Giorgio Vasari in the Lives of the Most Excellent Painters, Sculptors, and Architects, Zoppo worked with Perugino on the Sistine Chapel in the Vatican. He was best known for his paintings of the Madonna and for his portraits.

Notes

Italian Renaissance painters
Quattrocento painters
Italian male painters
Year of birth unknown
Zoppo
1508 deaths
16th-century Italian painters